Neptis frobenia is a butterfly in the family Nymphalidae. It is found on Mauritius.

The larvae feed on Acalypha species and Erythrospermum mauritiana.

References

Butterflies described in 1798
frobenia
Endemic fauna of Mauritius
Butterflies of Africa